The map–territory relation is the relationship between an object and a representation of that object, as in the relation between a geographical territory and a map of it. Polish-American scientist and philosopher Alfred Korzybski remarked that "the map is not the territory" and that "the word is not the thing", encapsulating his view that an abstraction derived from something, or a reaction to it, is not the thing itself. Korzybski held that many people do confuse maps with territories, that is, confuse conceptual models of reality with reality itself. These ideas are crucial to general semantics, a system Korzybski originated.

The relationship has also been expressed in other terms, such as "the model is not the data", "all models are wrong", and Alan Watts' "The menu is not the meal." The concept is thus quite relevant throughout ontology and applied ontology regardless of any connection to general semantics per se (or absence thereof). Its avatars are thus encountered in semantics, statistics, logistics, business administration, semiotics, and many other applications. 

A frequent coda to "all models are wrong" is that "all models are wrong (but some are useful)," which emphasizes the proper framing of recognizing map–territory differences—that is, how and why they are important, what to do about them, and how to live with them properly. The point is not that all maps are useless; rather, the point is simply to maintain critical thinking about the discrepancies: whether or not they are either negligible or significant in each context, how to reduce them (thus iterating a map, or any other model, to become a better version of itself), and so on.

"A map is not the territory"
The expression first appeared in print in "A Non-Aristotelian System and Its Necessity for Rigour in Mathematics and Physics", a paper that Alfred Korzybski gave at a meeting of the American Association for the Advancement of Science in New Orleans, Louisiana on December 28, 1931. The paper was reprinted in Science and Sanity, 1933, pp. 747–761. In this book, Korzybski acknowledges his debt to mathematician Eric Temple Bell, whose epigram "the map is not the thing mapped" was published in Numerology.

The Belgian surrealist artist René Magritte illustrated the concept of "perception always intercedes between reality and ourselves" in a number of paintings including a famous work entitled The Treachery of Images, which consists of a drawing of a pipe with the caption, Ceci n'est pas une pipe ("This is not a pipe").

In Understanding Media, Marshall McLuhan expanded this argument to electronic media with his introduction of the phrase "The Medium is the Message" (and later in the book titled The Medium is the Massage). Media representations, especially on screens, are abstractions, or virtual "extensions" of what our sensory channels, bodies, thinking and feeling do for us in real life.

This concept occurs in the discussion of exoteric and esoteric religions. Exoteric concepts are concepts which can be fully conveyed using descriptors and language constructs, such as mathematics. Esoteric concepts are concepts which cannot be fully conveyed except by direct experience. For example, a person who has never tasted an apple will never fully understand through language what the taste of an apple is. Only through direct experience (eating an apple) that experience can be fully understood.

Lewis Carroll, in Sylvie and Bruno Concluded (1893), made the point humorously with his description of a fictional map that had "the scale of a mile to the mile". A character notes some practical difficulties with such a map and states that "we now use the country itself, as its own map, and I assure you it does nearly as well."

Jorge Luis Borges's one-paragraph short story "On Exactitude in Science" (1946) describes a map that has the same scale as its territory.

Laura Riding, in her poem The Map of Places (1927), deals with this relation: "The map of places passes. The reality of paper tears."

The economist Joan Robinson (1962): "A model which took account of all the variegation of reality would be of no more use than a map at the scale of one to one."

Korzybski's argument about the map and the territory also influenced the Belgian surrealist writer of comics Jan Bucquoy for a storyline in his comic Labyrinthe: a map can never guarantee that one will find the way out, because the accumulation of events can change the way one looks at reality.

Author Robert M. Pirsig uses the idea both theoretically and literally in his book Lila when the main character/author becomes temporarily lost due to an over reliance on a map, rather than the territory that the map describes.

In 2010, French author Michel Houellebecq published his novel, La carte et le territoire, translated into English as The Map and the Territory. The title was a reference to Alfred Korzybski's aphorism. The novel was awarded the French literary prize, the Prix Goncourt.

The map-territory distinction is emphasized by Robert Anton Wilson in his book Prometheus Rising.

Author James A. Lindsay made the idea that the map is not reality a primary theme of his 2013 book Dot, Dot, Dot: Infinity Plus God Equals Folly. In it, he argues that all of our scientific theories, mathematics, and even the idea of God are conceptual maps often confused "for the terrain" they attempt to explain. In a foreword to the book, physicist Victor J. Stenger expresses agreement with this point of view.

Ralph Rumney (5 June 1934 – 6 March 2002), English artist, and member of the Situationist International titled one of his autobiographical memoirs The Map is not the Territory.

Relationship
Gregory Bateson, in "Form, Substance and Difference", from Steps to an Ecology of Mind (1972), argued the essential impossibility of knowing what any actual territory is.  Any understanding of any territory is based on one or more sensory channels reporting adequately but imperfectly:

Elsewhere in that same volume, Bateson argued that the usefulness of a map (a representation of reality) is not necessarily a matter of its literal truthfulness, but its having a structure analogous, for the purpose at hand, to the territory. Bateson argued this case at some length in the essay "The Cybernetics of “Self”: A Theory of Alcoholism" (1971).

To paraphrase Bateson's argument, a culture that believes that common colds are transmitted by evil spirits, that those spirits fly out of people when they sneeze, can pass from one person to another when they are inhaled or when both handle the same objects, etc., could have just as effective a "map" for public health as one that substituted microbes for spirits.

Another basic quandary is the problem of accuracy. Jorge Luis Borges' "On Exactitude in Science" (1946) describes the tragic uselessness of the perfectly accurate, one-to-one map:

A more extreme literary example, the fictional diary of Tristram Shandy is so detailed that it takes the author one year to set down the events of a single day – because the map (diary) is more detailed than the territory (life), yet must fit into the territory (diary written in the course of his life), it can never be finished. Such tasks are referred to as "supertasks".

With this  quotation of Josiah Royce, Borges describes a further conundrum of when the map is contained within the territory, infinite regress:

Neil Gaiman retells the parable in reference to storytelling in Fragile Things (it was originally to appear in American Gods):

The development of electronic media blurs the line between map and territory by allowing for the simulation of ideas as encoded in electronic signals, as Baudrillard argues in Simulacra and Simulation (1994, p. 1):

The philosopher David Schmidtz draws on this distinction in his book Elements of Justice, apparently deriving it from Wittgenstein's private language argument.

The fundamental trade-off between accuracy and usability of a map, particularly in the context of modelling, is known as Bonini's paradox, and has been stated in various forms, poetically by Paul Valéry: "Everything simple is false. Everything which is complex is unusable."

Historian of religion Jonathan Z. Smith concluded his eponymous essay collection, Map is not Territory with a rejoinder to scholars that echoes the Borgesian analysis (1978, p. 309):

See also

 All models are wrong
 Allegory of the cave
 Blind men and an elephant
 Direct and indirect realism
 Emic and etic
 Fallacy of misplaced concreteness
 Good regulator
 Ludic fallacy
 Mary's room
 Mental model
 Mind projection fallacy
 Nominalism
 Non-Aristotelian logic
 On the Content and Object of Presentations
 Philosophy of perception
 Reification (fallacy)
 Social constructionism
 Structural differential
 Surrogation
 Symbolism (disambiguation)
 Unintended consequences
 Use–mention distinction
 When a white horse is not a horse

References

External links
 The Map and the Territory
 Measures and Scapes MIT Department of Architecture

Abstraction
Cartography
Consensus reality
Dichotomies
Concepts in the philosophy of language
General semantics
Philosophical analogies
Conceptual distinctions
Criticism of rationalism